Metropol is the debut album by the English big beat group Lunatic Calm.

The song "Leave You Far Behind" is used in The Matrix, Mortal Kombat Annihilation, Test Drive 6, MotorStorm, Drive, and an early teaser trailer for Spider-Man. "Fuze", "Leave You Far Behind" and "The Sound" were added in the hoax Prodigy album "The Castbreeder" in 1998 under the names "The Castbreeder" (at the very beginning), "Castl Road" and "Abnormal Bunx" respectively.

Track listing

References 

Lunatic Calm albums
1997 debut albums